The 1991 Atlantic hurricane season was the first season since 1984 in which no hurricanes developed from tropical waves, which are the source for most North Atlantic tropical cyclones. The hurricane season officially began on June 1, and ended on November 30. It was the least active in four years due to higher than usual wind shear across the Atlantic Ocean. The first storm, Ana, developed on July 2 off the southeast United States and dissipated without causing significant effects. Two other tropical storms in the season – Danny and Erika – did not significantly affect land. Danny dissipated east of the Lesser Antilles, and Erika passed through the Azores before becoming extratropical. In addition, there were four non-developing tropical depressions. The second depression of the season struck Mexico with significant accompanying rains.

The most significant storm of the season was Hurricane Bob, which at the time was among the ten costliest United States hurricanes. After brushing the Outer Banks of North Carolina and Long Island in New York, the hurricane made landfall on Rhode Island. It caused $1.5 billion in damage (1991 USD), mostly in Massachusetts, and 17 fatalities. The strongest hurricane of the season was Claudette, which reached peak winds of  near Bermuda. It passed near the island but did not cause any damage. Fabian was the only tropical storm to move over or near Cuba or Florida, producing heavy rainfall but no damage. Hurricane Grace, the final named storm of the season, provided the energy that led to the development of a powerful nor'easter known as the Perfect Storm. Originating from an extratropical storm, the Perfect Storm intensified while moving westward toward New England, leaving $200 million in damage and causing coastal damage from Puerto Rico to Florida and northward through Canada. It later transitioned into a hurricane over the Gulf Stream, finally dissipating over Nova Scotia on November 2.

Seasonal forecasts

Before the start of the season, hurricane expert William M. Gray released his forecast for the year's activity, a yearly practice that he began in 1984. In early April, Gray anticipated a "mild" season with fewer than ten tropical storms, of which less than six would become hurricanes. Later that month, the Weather Research Center forecast ten named storms and six hurricanes, of which five would become major hurricanes while three would hit the United States. In early June, Gray released an updated report that predicted the formation of eight tropical storms, four hurricanes, and one major hurricane. The revised June total was very close to the actual season activity, with the exception of forecasting one fewer major hurricane. However, a later revision in August incorrectly anticipated less activity, when Gray predicted seven storms and three hurricanes.

Seasonal summary

Overall activity in 1991 was below normal. This was partially due to decreased tropical cyclogenesis from African tropical waves, which are troughs that move across the ocean with associated convection. In most seasons, the majority of storms develop from tropical waves. Of the season's twelve tropical cyclones, only five originated from tropical waves; in addition, only three of the eight tropical storms were from tropical waves, and none had the characteristics of a Cape Verde-type hurricane. From late April to late November, there were 73 tropical waves that exited the west coast of Africa. The total was higher than average, although many of them were poorly defined and had little thunderstorm activity. The waves traversed the Atlantic Ocean further south than normal, typically not becoming convectively active until moving across northern South America. Cyclogenesis was also suppressed by higher than normal wind shear, as well as low rainfall amounts across the Sahel. There were also no tropical storms in the Gulf of Mexico for only the third time in the 20th century, after 1927 and 1962. The season produced twelve tropical depressions, which was the lowest in five years. The eight tropical storms was the lowest amount in four years. Four of the storms developed into hurricanes, although for the first time in over 24 years, none of the hurricanes originated from tropical waves.

The season's activity was reflected with a low cumulative accumulated cyclone energy (ACE) rating of 36. ACE is, broadly speaking, a measure of the power of the hurricane multiplied by the length of time it existed, so storms that last a long time, as well as particularly strong hurricanes, have high ACEs. ACE is only calculated for full advisories on tropical systems at or exceeding  or tropical storm strength. Although officially, subtropical cyclones are excluded from the total, the figure above includes periods when storms were in a subtropical phase.

July 2
 1800 UTC (2:00 p.m.
July 4
 0000 UTC (8:00 p.m. EDT July 3) - Tropical Depression One strengthened into Tropical Storm Ana.
 1800 UTC (2:00 p.m.
July 5
 1800 UTC (2:00 p.m. EDT) - Tropical Storm Ana became extratropical  to the south of Cape Race.
 2200 UTC (5:00 p.m. CDT) - Tropical Depression Two formed in the western Gulf of Mexico.
July 6
 2200 UTC (5:00 p.m.
July 7
 0230 UTC (9:30 p.m. CDT) - Tropical Depression Two dissipated over Mexico.

August 16
 0000 UTC (8:00 p.m. EDT) - Tropical Depression Three formed just northeast of the Bahamas.
 1800 UTC (2:00 p.m. EDT) - Tropical Depression Three strengthened into Tropical Storm Bob.
August 17
 1800 UTC (2:00 p.m. EDT) - Tropical Storm Bob had strengthened into Category 1 hurricane.
August 18
 1800 UTC (2:00 p.m. EDT) - Hurricane Bob strengthened into a Category 2 hurricane.
August 19
 0600 UTC (2:00 a.m. EDT) - Hurricane Bob strengthened into a Category 3 hurricane.
 1200 UTC (8:00 a.m. EDT) - Hurricane Bob weakened back to a Category 2 hurricane.
 1720 UTC (1:20 p.m.
 1800 UTC (2:00 p.m.
August 20
 0000 UTC (8:00 p.m. EDT August 19) - Hurricane Bob rapidly weakened to a tropical storm after entering the Gulf of Maine.
 0130 UTC (9:30 p.m.
 1800 UTC (2:00 p.m. EDT) - Tropical Storm Bob transitioned into an extratropical storm in the Gulf of St. Lawrence.
August 24
 0600 UTC (2:00 a.m. EDT) - Tropical Depression Four formed in the vicinity of Cape Verde.
 1800 UTC (2:00 p.m.
August 26
 0600 UTC (2:00 a.m. EDT) - Tropical Depression Four dissipated.
August 28
 1600 UTC (12:00 p.m.
August 31
 1600 UTC (12:00 p.m. EDT) - Tropical Depression Five dissipated.

September 4
 1200 UTC (8:00 a.m.
September 5
 1200 UTC (8:00 a.m. EDT) - Tropical Depression Six strengthened into Tropical Storm Claudette.
September 6
 1200 UTC (8:00 a.m. EDT) - Tropical Storm Claudette strengthened into a Category 1 hurricane.
 1800 UTC (2:00 p.m. EDT) - Hurricane Claudette strengthened into a Category 2 hurricane.
September 7
 0000 UTC (8:00 p.m. EDT September 6) - Hurricane Claudette strengthened into a Category 3 hurricane.
 0000 UTC (8:00 p.m.
 1200 UTC (8:00 a.m. EDT) - Hurricane Claudette briefly strengthened into a Category 4 hurricane, which was not operationally known.
 1800 UTC (2:00 p.m. EDT) - Hurricane Claudette weakened back to a Category 3 hurricane.
September 8
 0000 UTC (8:00 p.m. EDT) - Hurricane Claudette weakened back to a Category 2 hurricane.
 1200 UTC (8:00 a.m. EDT) - Tropical Depression Seven strengthened into Tropical Storm Danny.
 1800 UTC (2:00 p.m. EDT) - Hurricane Claudette weakened back to a Category 1 hurricane.
 1800 UTC (2:00 p.m. EDT) - Tropical Depression Eight formed several hundred miles south-southwest of Cape Verde.
September 9
 0000 UTC (8:00 p.m.
 1800 UTC (2:00 p.m. EDT) - Tropical Depression Eight strengthened into Tropical Storm Erika.
September 10
 0600 UTC (2:00 a.m. EDT) - Hurricane Claudette weakened back to a tropical storm.
 1800 UTC (2:00 p.m.
September 11
 1200 UTC (8:00 a.m. EDT) - Tropical Storm Danny was downgraded back to a tropical depression.
 1800 UTC (2:00 p.m. EDT) - Tropical Storm Claudette was downgraded to a tropical depression.
 1800 UTC (2:00 p.m. EDT) - Tropical Depression Danny dissipated.
September 12
 0300 UTC (11:00 p.m.
 0600 UTC (2:00 a.m. EDT) - Tropical Storm Erika transitioned into an extratropical storm in the vicinity of the Azores.
 1800 UTC (2:00 p.m. EDT) - Tropical Depression Claudette transitioned into an extratropical storm.

October 15
 0000 UTC (8:00 p.m. EDT) - Tropical Depression Nine formed a few hundred miles west of Belize City, Belize.
 1200 UTC (8:00 a.m. EDT) - Tropical Depression Nine strengthened into Tropical Storm Fabian.
 2100 UTC (5:00 p.m.
October 16
 0000 UTC (8:00 p.m.
 0834 UTC (4:34 a.m.
 1800 UTC (2:00 p.m. EDT) - Tropical Storm Fabian transitioned into an extratropical storm near Grand Bahama Island.
October 24
 1200 UTC (8:00 a.m. EDT) - Tropical Depression Ten formed about midway between Lesser Antilles to Africa.
October 25
 1800 UTC (2:00 p.m. EDT) - Tropical Depression Ten dissipated.
 1800 UTC (2:00 p.m. EDT) - A subtropical depression formed to the south of Bermuda.
October 26
 0600 UTC (2:00 a.m. EDT) - The subtropical depression strengthened into a subtropical storm.
October 27
 1800 UTC (2:00 p.m. EDT) - The subtropical storm acquires tropical characteristics and was reclassified as Tropical Storm Grace.
October 28
 0000 UTC (8:00 p.m. EDT October 27) - Tropical Storm Grace strengthened into a Category 1 hurricane.
October 29
 0000 UTC (8:00 p.m. EDT October 28) - Hurricane Grace attained its minimum pressure of  while just south of Bermuda.
 1200 UTC (8:00 a.m. EDT) - Hurricane Grace strengthened into a Category 2 hurricane.
 1400 UTC (10:00 a.m.
 1800 UTC (2:00 p.m. EDT) - Hurricane Grace transitioned into extratropical storm.
October 31
 1800 UTC (2:00 p.m. EDT) - Another subtropical storm formed as the "Perfect Storm" was becoming tropical.

November 1
 0600 UTC (2:00 a.m. EDT) - The subtropical storm acquired tropical characteristics and was unofficially reclassified as "Tropical Storm Eight".
 1800 UTC (2:00 p.m. EDT) - "Tropical Storm Eight" strengthened into "Hurricane Eight".
November 2
 0600 UTC (2:00 a.m. EDT) - "Hurricane Eight" weakened back to a tropical storm.
 1400 UTC (10:00 a.m.
 1800 UTC (2:00 p.m. EDT) - "Tropical Storm Eight" was downgraded back to a tropical depression.
November 3
 0000 UTC (8:00 p.m. EDT November 2) - The tropical depression dissipated shortly after emerging into the Gulf of St. Lawrence.

Systems

Tropical Storm Ana 

The first storm of the season was Ana, which originated from a cold-core low that persisted east of Jacksonville, Florida, by June 25. The system moved in a clockwise motion around an anticyclone located over Florida. The cold-core low gradually developed to the surface, and on June 29, a low pressure area formed within a surface trough over the Bahamas. It moved westward across southern Florida, dropping heavy rainfall along its path. The low moved northwestward and later curved northeastward, exiting into the Atlantic Ocean near Saint Augustine by early on July 2.

As a result, the National Hurricane Center upgraded the depression to Tropical Storm Ana. The storm accelerated east-northeastward toward a stalled frontal zone, entering an area of increased wind shear. Moving over cooler waters and interacting with the frontal zone, the circulation became broad as the thunderstorms diminished.

Tropical Depression Two 

A tropical wave emerged off the coast of Africa on June 20, and no significant development occurred until it became Tropical Depression Two in the western Gulf of Mexico on July 5. On its first advisory, a tropical storm watch was issued for from Baffin Bay, Texas, southward to Tampico, Tamaulipas. Failing to intensify further, Tropical Depression Two made landfall near La Pesca, Tamaulipas, on July 6. The National Hurricane Center issued the final advisory on July 7, although the circulation persisted until July 9 southwest of Texas. The depression had only minor impacts in Mexico and Texas, other than rainfall.

Hurricane Bob 

Hurricane Bob originated from a decaying cold front, developing into a tropical depression early on August 16 near the Bahamas. It produced an area of organized convection, and the depression intensified into Tropical Storm Bob roughly 18 hours after forming. It gradually organized over the Gulf Stream, and based on reports from the Hurricane Hunters, Bob attained hurricane status on August 17. Shortly thereafter, the hurricane began to turn towards the north-northeast in response to a subtropical ridge over the Atlantic and the trough over the southeastern United States. Significantly cooler sea surface temperatures resulted in weakening. After brushing Long Island, the center of Bob moved over Block Island, Rhode Island. It rapidly weakened to tropical storm intensity while moving through the remainder of New England, hitting Rockport, Maine, early on August 20. After crossing New Brunswick, Bob became extratropical in the Gulf of St. Lawrence and lasted another nine days before dissipating west of Portugal.

The hurricane first affected the Carolinas, spawning four confirmed and nine unconfirmed tornadoes in North Carolina. One person each died in North and South Carolina, and about 10% of houses in the Outer Banks sustained minor roof damage. As the storm moved up the coast, heavy rain fell on the western side of the center. High winds left 300,000 people without power on Long Island. In neighboring Connecticut, strong winds downed trees across the region, with damage heaviest in the southeastern portion near the coast. Damage was heaviest as Bob made its final landfall, with wind gusts of  reported on Block Island, Rhode Island. The hurricane produced extensive beach erosion which destroyed coastal roads in the state. Monetary damage was greatest in Massachusetts, and along Bob's path through southeastern New England more than 60% of people were left without power. High tides and strong winds destroyed boats and houses along the Massachusetts coastline. The heaviest rainfall from the hurricane fell at the Portland International Jetport in Maine, where  fell during its passage. Across the United States, damage totaled $1.5 billion (1991 USD), including over $1 billion in Massachusetts. The high damage total made Bob among the ten costliest U.S. hurricanes at the time. In addition, there were 15 fatalities in the country. In Canada, high waves killed two people. In Fredericton, New Brunswick, tropical storm-force winds downed trees and power lines.

Tropical Depression Four 

One of the few vigorous tropical waves of the season emerged from the western coast of Africa with a large area of convection in late August. On August 24 it developed into a tropical depression near Cape Verde. Upon first forming, the depression had a circular area of convection near the center. It was initially well-organized, but the depression was not expected to intensify due to marginal water temperatures; tropical cyclones generally require warm waters to develop. By August 25, the system lost much of its deep convection, and on August 26 the depression dissipated to the west-southwest of the Cape Verde islands.

Tropical Depression Five 

Around the same time as the previous system dissipated, another tropical wave moved off the coast of Africa on August 26. Upon developing, the depression had a small area of convection with a spiral rainband, and the NHC anticipated slow strengthening to tropical storm status. With a ridge to the north, the depression maintained a general westward track. Ultimately, the depression failed to organize significantly. By August 29, it had a broad and poorly organized circulation with only scattered convection.

Hurricane Claudette 

Following its formation, it developed slowly while moving southwestward, and on September 5 it intensified into Tropical Storm Claudette. Conditions were favorable for development, with low wind shear and a large anticyclone providing outflow, or the outward wind flow from a storm. On September 6 at 0600 UTC, Claudette attained hurricane status.

After peaking, Claudette began steady weakening. Around that time, a hurricane watch was issued for the island of Bermuda, which was later upgraded to a warning. By September 10, Claudette weakened to tropical storm status as it accelerated eastward. The next day it deteriorated further to tropical depression status, and the next day Claudette became extratropical to the southwest of the Azores. It persisted two more days until dissipating over the Azores.

Tropical Storm Danny 

One of the most vigorous tropical waves of the season (which also led to the formation of Hurricane Jimena in the eastern Pacific) was first observed in western Africa on September 2. Three days later it emerged from the coast at Dakar, moving into the tropical Atlantic Ocean with rainbands around its convection. Upon developing, the depression had a broad circulation, located in an environment generally favorable for intensification. With a strong ridge to the north, the depression tracked steadily westward. After remaining a tropical depression for about 36 hours, the system became better organized and developed well-defined banding features. Based on satellite intensity estimates, the NHC upgraded it to Tropical Storm Danny on September 8.

Upon becoming a tropical storm, only slow strengthening was forecast, due to the presence of an upper-level trough to its west. On September 10 it attained its organizational maximum after developing a central dense overcast. Later that day, an upper-level low increased wind shear over the storm, which exposed the circulation from the deep convection. As Danny approached the Lesser Antilles, it weakened to tropical depression status on September 11. The remnants tracked to the northwest and later to the north before being absorbed by a frontal system.

Tropical Storm Erika 

The origins of Tropical Storm Erika were from a tropical wave that exited the coast of Africa on September 2. It moved northwestward, passing through Cape Verde the following day. The system had most of the thunderstorms along the southern portion of the wave as it maintained a very large low-level circulation. Initially the center was difficult to locate on satellite imagery, but despite the proximity with Claudette, conditions were generally favorable for intensification. By late on September 9, the depression had become much better organized, and based on satellite estimates the NHC upgraded it to Tropical Storm Erika.

Upon becoming a tropical storm, Erika began a motion to the northeast. There was initial uncertainty whether Erika or nearby Claudette would become the dominant system through their interaction. It accelerated east-northeastward toward the Azores along the northern periphery of a ridge, briefly interacting with Claudette. By September 11, the convection had diminished, leaving the center exposed as Erika underwent extratropical transition. Shortly thereafter it passed through the Azores, striking São Miguel Island. On September 12, Erika weakened to a tropical depression before completing the transition into an extratropical cyclone. It dissipated later that day.

Tropical Storm Fabian 

The origins of Fabian were from a tropical wave and a cold front that entered the northwestern Caribbean Sea on October 12, which produced an area of thunderstorms in the Gulf of Honduras. Based on the report, the NHC designated the system as Tropical Storm Fabian. although the NHC later assessed that the system developed as a tropical depression earlier that day. With a high pressure area to the north, there was already a large pressure gradient that had produced tropical storm force winds over the area. Initially the storm was disorganized, with its strongest winds located primarily east of the center. An eastward-moving upper-level trough imparted a northeast motion as well as unfavorable wind shear. By early on October 16, the center was becoming difficult to locate as Fabian moved through the Florida Straits. The storm later moved through the Bahamas and became extratropical as it interacted with an approaching front.

When Fabian first formed, the government of Cuba issued a tropical storm warning from Havana to Ciego de Ávila Province, as well as the Isle of Youth. There was also a tropical storm watch for the Florida Keys, as well as a tropical storm warning for the Bahamas. In a six-hour period, Punta del Este recorded . Prior to the storm's passage, two state parks were closed in the Florida Keys, and a few storm shelters were opened in Dade County. Only isolated flooding happened from the precursor system to Fabian.

Tropical Depression Ten 

A tropical wave moved off the coast of Africa on October 19. Moving westward, it developed a weak circulation on October 23. This was based on a rating of 1.5 on the Dvorak technique, which is a method of estimating the intensity of tropical cyclones via satellite. At the time of development, the depression had a small area of convection near and east of the center, and due to the wind shear it was never expected to intensify. By October 25, the circulation had become dissociated from the convection. The depression dissipated soon after without affecting land.

Hurricane Grace 

On October 23 a mid-level low formed south of Bermuda. By two days later it had become a surface low, and on October 26 it developed into a subtropical storm. The system was labeled as such due to the initial lack of deep convection over the center, although following an increase in thunderstorms the NHC reclassified it as Tropical Storm Grace late on October 27. By that time, the storm had executed a path generally to the northwest. Grace continued to intensify and organize, and based on Hurricane Hunter reports the storm was upgraded to a hurricane early on October 28. Shortly thereafter, Grace turned sharply to the east due to the influence of a rapidly intensifying extratropical cyclone off the New England coast. An eye developed in the center of Grace, despite shallow convection.

A rapidly approaching cold front absorbed Grace on October 29, contributing moisture to the developing extratropical storm that was eventually known as the Perfect Storm. As a tropical cyclone, Grace produced squally conditions across Bermuda, but no damage was reported. The hurricane generated large swells along the East Coast of the United States, causing minor beach erosion.

Hurricane Twelve (The Perfect Storm) 

The origins of the Perfect Storm were from an area of low pressure that developed off Atlantic Canada on October 28. It moved southward and westward as an extratropical cyclone due to a ridge to its north, and reached its peak intensity. The storm lashed the East Coast of the United States with high waves and coastal flooding, before turning to the southwest and weakening. Moving over warmer waters, the system transitioned into a subtropical cyclone before becoming a tropical storm. It executed a loop off the Mid-Atlantic states and turned toward the northeast. The tropical system weakened, striking Nova Scotia as a tropical storm before dissipating.

Damage totaled over $200 million (1991 USD) and the death toll was thirteen. Most of the damage occurred while the storm was extratropical, after waves up to  struck the coastline from Canada to Florida and southeastward to Puerto Rico. In Massachusetts, where damage was heaviest, over 100 homes were destroyed or severely damaged. To the north, more than 100 homes were affected in Maine, including the vacation home of George H. W. Bush, the president at the time. More than 38,000 people were left without power, and along the coast high waves inundated roads and buildings. In portions of New England, damage was worse than had occurred from Hurricane Bob two months prior. However, aside from tidal flooding along rivers, the storm's effects were primarily along the coastline. In the middle of the storm, the Andrea Gail sunk, claiming the lives of its crew of six, which later inspired the book as well as the movie The Perfect Storm. Off the coast of New York, a Coast Guard helicopter ran out of fuel and crashed, and although four members of its crew were rescued, one was killed. Two people died after their boat sank off Staten Island. High waves swept a person to their death in both Rhode Island and Puerto Rico, and another person was blown off a bridge in New York. The tropical cyclone that formed late in the storm's duration caused little impact, limited to power outages and slick roads; one person was killed in Newfoundland from a traffic accident related to the storm.

Storm names 
The list below shows the names that appeared on the tropical cyclone naming list in the Atlantic basin in 1991. Although the Perfect Storm later evolved into a hurricane, which could have been named "Henri", the National Hurricane Center left it unnamed due to the heavy damage and media interest in the predecessor extratropical storm. It later received the name the Perfect Storm after a conversation between Boston National Weather Service forecaster Robert Case and author Sebastian Junger. The names not retired from this list in 1991 appeared again on the naming list for the 1997 season. This is the same list used for the 1985 season, with the exception of the names Erika and Grace, which replaced the names Elena and Gloria after the 1985 season, and were used for the first time in 1991.

Retirement 

At their meeting in the spring of 1992, the World Meteorological Organization retired the name Bob from the list above due to its high impact. The name that replaced it on the naming list for the 1997 season was Bill.

Season effects 
This is a table of all of the storms that have formed in the 1991 Atlantic hurricane season. It includes their duration, names, landfall(s) – denoted by bold location names – damages, and death totals. Deaths in parentheses are additional and indirect (an example of an indirect death would be a traffic accident), but were still related to that storm. Damage and deaths include totals while the storm was extratropical, a wave, or a low, and all of the damage figures are in 1991 USD.

See also 

 Tropical cyclones in 1991
 List of Atlantic hurricanes
 Atlantic hurricane season
 1991 Pacific hurricane season
 1991 Pacific typhoon season
 1991 North Indian Ocean cyclone season
 South-West Indian Ocean cyclone season: 1990–91, 1991–92
 Australian region cyclone season: 1990–91, 1991–92
 South Pacific cyclone season: 1990–91, 1991–92
 South Atlantic tropical cyclone

Notes

References

External links 
 Monthly Weather Review
 Detailed information on all storms from 1991
 U.S. Rainfall information concerning 1991 tropical cyclones

 
Articles which contain graphical timelines